Olga Seleznyova (born 7 June 1975) is a Kazakhstani cross-country skier. She competed in four events at the 1998 Winter Olympics.

References

External links
 

1975 births
Living people
Kazakhstani female cross-country skiers
Olympic cross-country skiers of Kazakhstan
Cross-country skiers at the 1998 Winter Olympics
People from Kostanay
Asian Games medalists in cross-country skiing
Cross-country skiers at the 1996 Asian Winter Games
Cross-country skiers at the 1999 Asian Winter Games
Asian Games gold medalists for Kazakhstan
Medalists at the 1999 Asian Winter Games
20th-century Kazakhstani women